Krystyna Smiechowska (born 1935) is a Polish painter.

Her work is included in the collections of the Musée national des beaux-arts du Québec and the Portland Museum of Art

References

Living people
1935 births
20th-century Polish women artists
21st-century Polish artists
Artists from Kraków